Geoffrey Kipsang Kamworor (born 22 November 1992) is a Kenyan professional long-distance runner who competes in cross country, marathon, and half marathon races. He was the 2011 World Junior Cross Country Champion. Kamworor won the IAAF World Half Marathon Championships three times in a row from 2014 to 2018. In the IAAF World Cross Country Championships he won in 2015 and 2017.

He won his first World Marathon Major at the 2017 New York City Marathon. Kamworor again won the New York City Marathon in 2019.

He is the former half marathon world record holder, having won the Copenhagen Half Marathon with a time of 58:01, on Sunday, 15 September 2019. His record stood until December 2020 when it was bested by Kibiwott Kandie at the 2020 Valencia Half Marathon.

Career
Geoffrey was raised in the village of Chepkorio in Kenya's Rift Valley Province, he first competed abroad in 2010, when he travelled to Finland and set track bests of 3:48.15 minutes for the 1500 metres and 7:54.15 minutes over 3000 metres. The following year he took to the Kenya cross country circuit and won at the Discovery Kenya Cross Country in Eldoret, defeating Essa Ismail Rashed. At the Kenyan Cross Country Championships a month later, he ran in the junior section and finished in fourth, which was enough to earn him a place on the team for the 2011 IAAF World Cross Country Championships. The world competition proved to be a pivotal moment for Kamworor's career, although it was his teammate Isiah Kiplangat Koech who was the pre-race favourite. The Kenyans were not given any team instructions and Kamworor reacted by taking the lead immediately with a very fast start. He never slipped out of the lead and out ran the field on the final lap to take the world junior title.

A month after his cross country victory, he entered the Berlin Half Marathon and won in a time of 1:00:38 hours. In June he competed in the 2011 IAAF Diamond League circuit: he set a 5000 metres best of 13:12.23 minutes at the Adidas Grand Prix in New York, then improved his 10,000 metres time to 27:06.35 minutes at the Prefontaine Classic. He knocked over half a minute off his half marathon best to win the Lille Half Marathon that September. Kamworor was employed as a pacemaker for the 2011 Berlin Marathon and his work resulted in a new world record for Patrick Makau. In his final outing of the year he ended the Delhi Half Marathon as runner-up to Lelisa Desisa after a sprint finish, although his time of 59:31 minutes made him the seventh fastest over the distance that year.

Kamworor marked his entrance into the senior cross country ranks with a win at the 2012 Cross Internacional de Itálica in Seville. He was the runner-up at the Elgoibar Cross Country behind Paul Tanui the following week. He set a half marathon best at the CPC Loop Den Haag in March, recording a time of 59:26 minutes for fourth place in a high calibre competition. He was enlisted to pace the Rotterdam Marathon and led the runners quicker than the world record pace up to 30 km. He won the World 10K Bangalore title, beating a large field of prominent runners. His marathon debut, not as a pacemaker, came in September, where he ran a fast time of 2:06:12 hours to claim third place at the 2012 Berlin Marathon.

In the 2013 season he ran a series of half and full marathons. He won the Ras Al Khaimah Half Marathon with a time of 58:54, a new personal best and just two seconds outside the course record. He was the winner of the Bogotá Half Marathon in July and was runner-up to Atsedu Tsegay at the Delhi Half Marathon. He placed fourth at the Rotterdam Marathon (2:09:12 hours) and his best performance that year was a run of 2:06:26 hours for third at the 2013 Berlin Marathon. But in March he did win the world half Marathon Championships defeating  five time world half Marathon Championships winner Zersenay Tadese.
In 2015 he started off his year winning the  world cross country championships beating Muktha of Ethiopia. He 
won the Prefontaine classic 10k, the Kenyan National thousand and 10 K and the world championship silver medal in the 10,000 m.
He won the 2017 New York City Marathon with a time of 2:10:53. He beat fellow Kenyan, Wilson Kipsang, who placed second, just three seconds behind him.

In 2018, he won his third straight half marathon world championship in Valencia in 1:00:02. Also in 2018 Kamworor placed third in the 2018 New York City Marathon with a time of 2:06:26 behind the first and second place Ethiopian runners Lelisa Desisa and Shura Kitata.

Kamworor won the Copenhagen Half Marathon on 15 September 2019 in a world record time of 58:01. In November, he won the 2019 New York City Marathon with a time of 2:08:13, his second time winning the race in three years.

On June 27, 2020, Kamworor was hit by a motorcycle while out on a daily run resulting in a tibia fracture that required surgery. In January 2021, he ran his first race since the accident, winning the 2021 Kenya Police Cross Country Championship 10k in a time of 29:22. On June 18, 2021, he secured his spot on the Kenyan 2020 Olympic 10000 metre team by winning at the Kenyan trials in Kasarani in 27:01.

Kamworor was set to compete in the Tokyo Olympics but had to pull out of the competition due to an ankle injury.

Major competition record

Personal bests
 5000 metres – 12:59.98 (Eugene, OR 2016)
 10,000 metres – 26:52.65 (Eugene, OR 2015)
Road
 10 kilometres – 27:44 (Bangalore 2014)
 Half marathon – 58:01 (Copenhagen 2019) former World record
 Marathon – 2:05:23 (Valencia 2021)

References

External links

Living people
1992 births
People from Rift Valley Province
Kenyan male long-distance runners
Kenyan male marathon runners
World Athletics Cross Country Championships winners
World Athletics Half Marathon Championships winners
World Athletics Championships athletes for Kenya
World Athletics Championships medalists
Athletes (track and field) at the 2016 Summer Olympics
Olympic athletes of Kenya
Kenyan male cross country runners
New York City Marathon male winners